Cochlespira pulcherrissima is a species of sea snail, a marine gastropod mollusk in the family Cochlespiridae .

Description
The size of an adult shell varies between 27 mm and 36 mm.

Distribution
This species occurs in the Pacific Ocean off Japan, Taiwan and the Philippines.

References

External links
 

pulcherrissima
Gastropods described in 1955